Wrong Turn, originally known as Wrong Turn: The Foundation, is a 2021 horror film directed by Mike P. Nelson and written by franchise creator Alan McElroy. The film, being a reboot, is the seventh installment of the Wrong Turn film series, stars Charlotte Vega, Adain Bradley, Emma Dumont, Dylan McTee, Daisy Head, Bill Sage, and Matthew Modine. It is an international co-production between the United States, Germany, and Canada.

The project was announced in October 2018, with Nelson signed as director, from a screenplay written by McElroy, who wrote the original film. Principal photography began on September 9, 2019, and wrapped on November 2, 2019, in Felicity, Ohio.

Wrong Turn was theatrically released for one day, January 26, 2021, by Saban Films. The film received mixed reviews from critics and grossed $4.8 million at the box office and $2 million in home sales.

Plot
Jen Shaw, her boyfriend Darius, and couples Adam and Milla and Gary and Luis, arrive in a small town in rural Virginia to hike the Appalachian Trail. They encounter hostility from locals in the bar, especially from Nate. Jen also meets a strange woman called Edith; with her is a young mute girl, Ruthie.

They begin their hike and, despite warnings, go off the trail to find an old fort. A huge tree trunk rolls down the hill and fatally crushes Gary. Bruised, disoriented and lost, the group sets up camp for the night. The following day, Milla goes missing, as well as their cellphones. They find a plaque dated 1859 commemorating the creation of a group of settlers in the mountains called the "Foundation", who believed the end of the United States was near.
 
While looking for Milla, Adam triggers a trap and is dragged into a pit. Jen, Darius and Luis come across a barn full of backpacks and clothing, then see Adam trussed to a pole, carried between two men wearing strange costumes and animal skull masks. The friends confront the men, who talk in a language they can't understand. Adam breaks free and manically beats one of them to death while the other escapes. Milla appears, having earlier gone for a bathroom break and evaded the two men. The friends encounter other traps and are surrounded by more masked men. Milla falls into a pit and is impaled on stakes. She is killed with an arrow by a member of the Foundation. Jen, Adam, Darius and Luis are all captured.
 
The group is taken to a primitive settlement deep in the forest, the headquarters of the Foundation, and put before a "court". Edith is one of their captors. Morgan, the brother of the man Adam killed, testifies how Adam murdered his brother, Samuel. The group is charged with murder. The leader, Venable, sentences Adam to death. The others are sentenced to "darkness". Adam breaks free and holds Ruthie hostage, demanding the release of his friends. Ruthie uses a concealed blade to stab Adam in the leg; he is then executed in front of his friends by Venable, who beats him to death using the log he used to kill Samuel.

Luis tries to flee and Venable blinds him with a hot poker. Jen begs Venable for mercy. Venable agrees, and she and Darius are initiated into the community. Jen reluctantly becomes Venable's sexual partner. 

Six weeks later, Scott Shaw, Jen's father, arrives the town to search for his daughter. He pays a local tracker to take him through the forest. After a trap kills the tracker and his son, Scott finds the settlement but is captured. Jen, now married to Venable, shoots her father with an arrow. Venable sentences Scott to "darkness" for trespassing and imprisons him. That night, Jen releases her father, revealing she only shot him so as not to raise suspicion. She tries to get Darius to run away with her and Scott, but he refuses to leave. Ruthie helps them escape before Venable and the other cultists pursue them. They discover an underground chamber full of blinded and shambling prisoners, including Luis. Jen mercy kills him and flees with Scott, killing several cultists, including Edith. They encounter Nate and other armed townsmen who offer to help. The cultists attack them, wounding Jen, but Scott and Jen escape. 
 
Several months later, Jen and her father have returned to their normal lives. Jen visits her stepmother, but finds her in the process of welcoming Venable and Ruthie to the neighborhood. Jen confronts Venable, who notices that she is pregnant with his child. He asks Jen to return with him to the Foundation. Jen agrees on the condition that Venable never again interfere with her family. She, Venable, and Ruthie leave, driving away in a recreational vehicle (RV). As the end credits roll, Jen causes the RV to crash into a parked car. Jen stabs Venable to death and kills the other cultist, the RV driver as well. She then takes Ruthie's hand as they walk back towards her family home.

Cast 

 Charlotte Vega as Jennifer "Jen" Shaw
 Adain Bradley as Darius Clemons
 Bill Sage as Venable / Ram Skull
 Emma Dumont as Milla D'Angelo
 Dylan McTee as Adam Lucas
 Daisy Head as Edith
 Matthew Modine as Scott Shaw
 Vardaan Arora as Gary Amaan
 Adrian Favela as Luis Ortiz
 Tim de Zarn as Nate Roades
 Rhyan Elizabeth Hanavan as Ruthie
 Chaney Morrow as Hobbs
 Damian Maffei as Morgan / Deer Skull
 Mark Mench as Standard / Wolf Skull
 David Hutchison as Cullen / Boar Skull
 Chris Hahn as Samuel / Elk Skull
 Valerie Jane Parker as Corrine
 Daniel R. Hill as Reggie

Production

Development
In October 2018, a reboot of the Wrong Turn film series was announced. The film was directed by Mike P. Nelson and written by Alan B. McElroy, who wrote the original film in 2003. In May 2019, it was announced that Charlotte Vega would star in the film.

In an interview with director Nelson for Fangoria, he stated:

Filming
Principal photography began on September 9, 2019, in Ohio and wrapped on 
November 2.

Music
The film was composed by Stephen Lukach. The soundtrack album, which was titled Wrong Turn: The Foundation, and was released by Konigskinder Music on February 25, 2021.

Release
Wrong Turn was originally scheduled for release in 2020, but was pushed to 2021 due to the COVID-19 pandemic. On December 16, 2020, it was announced that the film would premiere in American theaters for one night only on January 26, 2021.

The film was released on Blu-ray and DVD on February 23, 2021, by Lionsgate Home Entertainment. The film grossed $2 million in home sales.

Critical reception
On Review aggregator Rotten Tomatoes, the site gave the film a 65% approval rating based on 65 reviews, with an average rating of 6/10. The site's consensus reads, "Wrong Turn is a cut below more effective horror outings, but viewers in the mood for some gory chills will find that this franchise reboot does more than a few things right". On Metacritic, it assigned the film a weighted average score of 46 out of 100 based on seven critics who gave the film "mixed or average reviews".

Nick Allen of RogerEbert.com gave the film three out of four stars, writing that "McElroy and Nelson evolve Wrong Turn into a bizarre, winding odyssey, albeit with a lot more on its mind than just a cool kill."

References

External links
 

2021 films
2021 horror films
American horror thriller films
American LGBT-related films
Canadian horror thriller films
Canadian LGBT-related films
Constantin Film films
English-language Canadian films
English-language German films
Films postponed due to the COVID-19 pandemic
Films set in West Virginia
Films shot in Ohio
German slasher films
LGBT-related horror films
Reboot films
Saban Entertainment films
Wrong Turn (film series)
2020s English-language films
2020s Canadian films
2020s American films